Nikol Merizaj (born 7 August 1998) is an Albanian swimmer. She competed in the women's 100 metre freestyle event at the 2016 Summer Olympics where she finished 43rd in the heats and did not advance.

In 2019, she represented Albania at the 2019 World Aquatics Championships held in Gwangju, South Korea. She competed in the women's 50 metre freestyle and women's 100 metre freestyle events. In both events she did not advance to compete in the semi-finals.

References

External links
 

1998 births
Living people
Albanian female swimmers
Olympic swimmers of Albania
Swimmers at the 2016 Summer Olympics
Swimmers at the 2018 Mediterranean Games
Albanian female freestyle swimmers
Mediterranean Games competitors for Albania
Swimmers at the 2020 Summer Olympics